Brephulopsis is a genus of gastropods belonging to the family Enidae.

The species of this genus are found in near Black Sea.

Species:

Brephulopsis bidens 
Brephulopsis cylindrica 
Brephulopsis konovalovae 
Brephulopsis subulata

References

Enidae